The National Building Arts Center (NBAC) is a large collection of significant architectural, structural, and industrial items saved before these elements from the built environment are demolished. It is the physical collection of the St. Louis Building Arts Foundation. The Center salvages and stores important architectural and industrial elements to promote public awareness of architecture, manufacturing, construction, and urban design in the built environment. It also works to ensure historic preservation of existing buildings and maintains an extensive research library. The foundation and center began as the personal collecting hobby and the architectural salvaging business of Larry Giles, a pioneering historic preservationist in St. Louis, Missouri, United States.

The Center started by saving architecturally significant pieces of historic buildings in the St. Louis region prior to the associated structures being demolished but now takes pieces from around the country and occasionally internationally. It also collects artifacts prior to major renovations of historic structures. Columns, beams, façades, statues and monuments, and other architectural elements were initially stored in a number of warehouse spaces around St. Louis for a number of years. In addition to saving pieces prior to demolition, the Center now also holds the contents of other museums and collections. It holds more of the physical history of New York City than is held in New York.

In 2007, the collection was consolidated and moved to Sauget, Illinois, in the former Sterling Steel Casting foundry property, the historical character of which has largely been retained to illustrate its original use as NBAC repurposed and restored the facilities. It cost about $1 million to acquire the Sauget site and move the artifacts there in 350 semi-truck loads.

The Center provides tours upon scheduled request and plans to one day show their collection to the general public similar to a museum format. In the original plans for the Gateway Arch there was an idea to include an architecture museum on the Illinois side of the Mississippi River. The facility is located within sight of the Arch and with a partial view of downtown St. Louis. To raise money for the site and operations, the Center sells duplicates and doubles of artifacts, in addition to traditional fundraising, as well as some items (typically duplicates) from the library.

Items in the collection include:

 -tall terracotta frieze from the 18-story Ambassador Theater Building
 Missouri Pacific Building
 St. Louis Terra Cotta company
 Soulard Station Post Office
 Gaslight Square
 State Bank of Wellston sign and support mast (saved after Giles raised $19,000 to rent necessary equipment including a crane and flatbed trucks to salvage the rotating illuminated sign)
 Elements from the Globe Building, which was remodeled but remains
 Cherokee Native Statue, which was removed from the Cherokee Street district to respect the original inhabitants of the land
 Most of the architectural collection of the Brooklyn Museum

See also

 National Building Museum (Washington, DC)
 Museum of Architecture

References

External links
 National Building Arts Center website

Collections of museums in the United States
Architecture museums in the United States
Design museums in the United States
Industry museums in the United States
Library-related organizations
Architecture nonprofits in the United States
Culture of St. Louis
Former private collections in the United States
Arts foundations based in the United States
Architecture of St. Louis
Architecture in Missouri
Organizations based in Illinois
2002 establishments in Missouri